Pinar Atalay (born 27 April 1978) is a German radio and television presenter.

Life and career 
Atalay was born to Turkish immigrants parents in Lemgo, West Germany. After high school she ran, for one year, a boutique in Lemgo. She later worked as a freelancer and trainee, and was, for a time, an early-morning presenter at the local radio station .

On WDR Fernsehen, Atalay regularly hosted Cosmo TV. For ARD-aktuell, she hosted regular news and special programs, including for Das Erste. She also worked as a reporter and presenter for NDR Fernsehen,  NDR Radio and Radio Bremen. From 2010 onwards, she presented programmes on Phoenix. In March 2014, Atalay became a presenter of the Tagesthemen evening news, succeeding Ingo Zamperoni. In a 2018 survey conducted by Forsa Institute, she was voted one of Germany's most trusted news presenters.

In addition to her role as presenter, Atalay wrote articles for the German business magazine Plusminus from 2014.

In June 2021, German private TV channel RTL announced that Atalay would be starting as news anchor in August 2021. Alongside Peter Kloeppel, she moderated one of three TV election debates between the three candidates to succeed Chancellor Angela Merkel – Annalena Baerbock, Armin Laschet and Olaf Scholz – ahead of the 2021 elections, which was aired live on both RTL and n-tv during prime-time.

Other activities 
 Jugend debattiert, Member of the Board of Trustees

Personal life 
In January 2017, Atalay gave birth to a daughter.

References

External links 
 
 CV from phoenix.de (in German)
 

1978 births
Living people
People from Lemgo
German people of Turkish descent
German broadcast news analysts
German television presenters
German women television presenters
German women television journalists
German television journalists
ARD (broadcaster) people
RTL Group people
Norddeutscher Rundfunk people
Westdeutscher Rundfunk people
21st-century German journalists
German television news anchors
21st-century German women